Winter in Wartime  is a 2008 Dutch war film directed by Martin Koolhoven. The screenplay was written by Mieke de Jong, Paul Jan Nelissen, and Martin Koolhoven based on  Jan Terlouw's eponymous 1972 novel.

The film was hugely successful in the Netherlands, out-grossing competing films like Twilight and The Dark Knight. Additionally, it was the highest-grossing film in the Netherlands during Christmas 2008 and the first weeks of 2009.

The film was chosen by the Dutch Critics as the best Dutch film of 2008; it won the PZC Audience Award (best movie based on a novel), three Rembrandt Awards, and three Golden Calf awards. Also, it was chosen as Best Film by the Young Jury (14–18 years) at the Rome Film Festival and was shortlisted (with eight other movies) at the Academy Awards, in the section Best Foreign Language Film.

It was released in the United States by Sony Pictures Classics on 18 March 2011.

Plot
A teenage Dutch boy, named Michiel van Beusekom, tries to assist the Dutch resistance during World War II by helping a British airman stay out of German hands during the Nazi occupation of the Netherlands.

Michiel feels resentment towards his father, the mayor, who is seemingly only interested in maintaining the status quo between the town and the German Army. However, Michiel worships his Uncle Ben, an adventurer in contact with the local resistance. During the winter of 1944–1945, Michiel's loyalties are tested.

An RAF de Havilland Mosquito is hit in the air and crashes, but before it hits the ground, a young British airman is able to escape by parachute.

One of the villagers, Dirk (the elder brother of Michiel's best friend), helps the airman, Jack, but Dirk is later arrested. Before his arrest, Dirk gives Michiel a letter to be delivered to Bertus, the village blacksmith. Before Michiel can deliver the letter, Bertus is shot and killed by the Germans.

Michiel opens the letter, which directs him to Jack's hiding place in the forest. Jack is injured, and Michiel enlists the aid of his sister Erica, a nurse, to take care of him. Jack and Erica soon develop a romantic relationship.

Michiel's father is arrested when the body of a German soldier, killed by Jack on the night of the plane crash, is found in the forest. Jack wants to turn himself in to save Michiel's father, but Ben tells Michiel he (Ben) can save his father. Ben's efforts fail, and Michiel's father is shot by the Germans along with two other men as reprisal for the death of the soldier.

Michiel tries to take Jack to meet his contact in the town of Zwolle, across the River IJssel, but the Germans foil their attempt, and the two narrowly escape after a horseback chase through the forest. Michiel finally turns to his Uncle Ben for help in getting Jack to Zwolle. Ben agrees, and goes to have a smoke with Jack, who is now hiding in a shed at the bottom of their garden.

The next morning, Michiel goes to the shed to check on Jack, but he is not there. He finds him in Erica's room, in bed with his sister. After this, Ben, Jack, and Erica set off for the bridge to Zwolle. As they leave, Ben tells Michiel that Dirk should never have gotten Michiel involved with Jack. After they go, Michiel realizes that he had never mentioned Dirk's role to Ben. Quickly checking Ben's suitcase, he finds papers showing that Ben is working for the Germans.

Rushing to the river, Michiel stops the trio, grabs Jack's pistol, and confronts Ben. While Michiel guards Ben, Jack and Erica succeed in making it across the river to Zwolle. Ben tells Michiel that he had arranged for his father to be released, but that his father refused to let another villager be shot in his place. Ben attempts to escape to a passing German patrol, but Michiel shoots and kills him.

A few months later, Allied soldiers enter the village and are rapturously welcomed by the villagers. One of the soldiers brings a letter for Erica, presumably from Jack. Michiel hesitates to join in the celebrations after all that has happened, but finally joins in.

Cast

 Martijn Lakemeier as Michiel van Beusekom
 Yorick van Wageningen as Oom Ben
 Jamie Campbell Bower as Jack
 Raymond Thiry as Vader van Beusekom
 Melody Klaver as Erica van Beusekom
 Anneke Blok as Moeder van Beusekom
 Mees Peijnenburg as Dirk Knopper
 Tygo Gernandt as Bertus
 Dan van Husen as Colonel Auer
 Ad van Kempen as Schafter

Production
The film's budget was estimated to be €4 million.

Filming locations in the Netherlands included the community of Herwijnen in the province of Gelderland, Lopik in the province of Utrecht, Zwolle in Overijssel as well as the communities of Megen and Woudrichem in North Brabant. The area around the old town hall of Megen, as well as the building itself, doubled as the location where the Germans had their headquarters.

Two other locations were situated in Lithuania, in Silute and Vilnius.

Distribution

The film premiered in Amsterdam on 17 November 2008. It was released in Belgium on 3 December 2008 and in Germany was shown at the Berlin International Film Festival in February 2009. Other film festivals where Winter in Wartime was shown include the South Korean Pusan International Film Festival, the Rome Film Festival, the Palm Springs International Film Festival, and three Canadian European Union Film Festivals.

Reception
Approximately 900,000 people in the Netherlands and 60,000 people in Belgium saw the film in cinemas.

Critical reception 

Winter In Wartime was short-listed for the Academy Awards' Best Foreign Language Film. On Rotten Tomatoes the film has a rating of 74% based on reviews from 66 critics. On Metacritic it has a score of 66% based on reviews from 18 critics, indicating "generally favorable reviews".

See also
 Cinema of the Netherlands
 List of Dutch submissions for the Academy Award for Best Foreign Language Film
 The Resistance Banker

References

External links
  
  
 
 
 

2008 films
2000s Dutch-language films
Films scored by Pino Donaggio
Dutch war films
Films directed by Martin Koolhoven
Films based on Dutch novels
2000s war films
Dutch World War II films